

Events

Works
 Heinrich Frauenlob writes Frauenleich and Alle Freude verlässt mich

Births
 Abu Es Haq es Saheli (died 1346), Andalusī-born Arabic poet and architect
 Jyotirishwar Thakur (died 1350), Sanskrit poet and early Maithili writer
 Jakushitsu Genkō (died 1367), Japanese Rinzai master, poet, flute player and first abbot of Eigen-ji
 Ke Jiusi (died 1343), Chinese landscape painter, calligrapher and poet during the Yuan dynasty
 Sesson Yūbai (died 1348), Japanese Rinzai priest and poet

Deaths
 Guido delle Colonne (born 1215) Sicilian writer, in Latin
 Shem-Tov ibn Falaquera (born 1225), Hebrew poet in Al-Andalus
 Tran Thanh Tong (born 1240), Vietnamese poet and ruler

13th-century poetry
Poetry